Balbau (also, Bal’bo and Bol’bay) is a village in the Astara Rayon of Azerbaijan.  The village forms part of the municipality of Asxanakəran.

References 

Populated places in Astara District